The 2016–17 National League 2 South was the eighth season (30th overall) of the fourth tier (south) of the English domestic rugby union competitions since the professionalised format of the second division was introduced.  New teams to the division include Henley Hawks and Cinderford (both relegated from National League 1) while Exmouth (champions) and Barnstaple were promoted from National League 3 South West along with London Irish Wild Geese who won National League 3 London & SE.  The league system is 4 points for a win, 2 points for a draw and additional bonus points being awarded for scoring 4 or more tries and/or losing within 7 points of the victorious team.  In terms of promotion the league champions are promoted to National League 1 while the second-placed team play-off against the second-placed team from National League 2 North (at the home ground of the club with the superior league record) for the final promotion place.

At the end of the season Bishop's Stortford were crowned champions on 22 April 2017 after beating Exmouth 60-7 away - reaching the highest level in the clubs' history.  It was a worthy reward for Bishop's Stortford who finished 3rd the previous season and lost the playoff the season before that.  A further highlight for Bishop's Stortford was the club record attendance of 1,664 that attending Silver Leys for the final league match of the season - a figure that was also the highest in National League 2 South that year.  Although Bishop's Stortford's won the league with a game to spare it had been a very close battle for promotion as they faced strong competition from Chinnor and Old Elthamians up until the penultimate game.  Chinnor had looked likely champions during the first half of the season but in the end missed out on promotion altogether, as despite finishing dead level on points with Old Elthamians they had one less win than the Kent side.

As runners up Old Elthamians would have to head north for their promotion playoff as the 2016–17 National League 2 North second placed side, Sale, had finished with more 2 more league points (124 to 122).  On 6 May 2017 Old Elthamians beat Sale 19-14 at Heywood Road to clinch promotion to join Bishop's Stortford in the 2017–18 National League 1 - and just like the Hertfordshire side it would the highest level Old Elthamians had ever reached in the club's history.

The liquidation of London Welsh in January 2017, and their expulsion from the RFU Championship, meant that there were only 5 teams instead of the usual 6 relegated from National League 2 South and National League 2 North this season - meaning that one league would have 3 teams going down and the other having just 2 depending on league points gained.  Newly promoted Exmouth were the first team to be relegated on 8 April 2017 when they lost 20-36 away to Clifton, way adrift of the teams above them.  The other spots were much more keenly contested with 4 teams facing possible relegation on the last day of the season in what was one of the most exciting relegation battles for years.  In the end it was Barnes who went down - a final round try bonus point defeat not enough despite tying them with relegation rivals, Barnstaple, who had a superior win record.  Any other season Barnstaple would have gone down as they finished in 14th place but they ended up having more than the equivalent side Harrogate had in the 2016–17 National League 2 North - 51 points to 47 - condemning the Yorkshire side to the drop instead.  The final league table shows how close this season was at both ends of the table.  Only 5 points separate the top 3 sides, while just 3 points separate 12th placed Worthing Raiders from 15th placed Barnes.  Exmouth would fall down to National League 3 South West while Barnes would drop to National League 3 London & SE.

Other points to consider for the season was that despite falling attendances in leagues such as the RFU Championship, National League 2 South actually recorded an increase in overall attendances - up to 91,074 (or 379 per game) from 88,674 (369 per game) the previous year.  This was helped by record club attendances for both Bishop's Stortford and Chinnor (both over 1,500), while promoted side Barnstaple also did well.  Redruth, who struggled towards the end of the season, were once again the best supported side in the division, averaging over 800 supporters per game.  This was despite losing the Cornish derby with Launceston who were relegated the previous season.

Structure
The league consists of sixteen teams with all the teams playing each other on a home and away basis to make a total of thirty matches each. There is one automatic promotion place, one play-off place and three relegation places. The champions are promoted to the 2017–18 National League 1 and the runners-up play the second-placed team in the 2016–17 National League 2 North with the winner being promoted. The last three teams are relegated to either National League 3 London & SE or National League 3 South West depending on the geographical location of the team (in some cases teams may join the Midlands regional leagues).

Participating teams and locations
Eleven of the teams listed below participated in the 2015–16 National League 2 South season; Henley Hawks and Cinderford were relegated from the 2015–16 National League 1 while London Irish Wild Geese were promoted as champions of National League 3 London & SE and Exmouth (champions) and Barnstaple (playoffs) from National League 3 South West.  This season would also see Old Elthamians move from the 500 capacity Queen Mary Sports Ground in Chislehurst to College Meadow in Eltham.

League table

Results

Round 1

Round 2

Round 3

Round 4

Round 5

Round 6

Round 7

Round 8

Round 9

Round 10

Round 11

Round 12

Round 13

Round 14

Round 15

Round 16

Round 17

Round 18

Round 19
 
Postponed as Canterbury RFC felt that the pitch was unplayable due to recent cold weather.  Game rescheduled to 25 February 2017.      
 
 
Postponed due to frozen pitch.  Game rescheduled to 25 February 2017.
 
 
 
Postponed due to frozen pitch.  Game rescheduled to 25 February 2017.

Round 20

Round 21

Round 22

Round 23

Round 19 (rescheduled games) 

Game rescheduled from 21 January 2017.

Game rescheduled from 21 January 2017.

Game rescheduled from 21 January 2017.

Round 24

Round 25

Round 26

Round 27

Round 28 

Exmouth are relegated.

Round 29 

Bishop's Stortford are champions.

Round 30 

Barnes are relegated.

Promotion play-off
Each season, the runners-up in the National League 2 North and National League 2 South participate in a play-off for promotion to National Division 1. Sale were runners-up in the 2016–17 National League 2 North and because they had a better record than the 2016–17 National League 2 South runners-up, Old Elthamians, they hosted the play-off match.

Attendances
Does not include promotion play-off.

Individual statistics
 Note that points scorers includes tries as well as conversions, penalties and drop goals. Appearance figures also include coming on as substitutes (unused substitutes not included).  Does not include promotion playoff.

Top points scorers

Top try scorers

Season records

Team
Largest home win — 76 points
90 - 7 Old Elthamians at home to Exmouth on 25 March 2017
Largest away win — 56 points
70 - 14 Redruth away to Worthing Raiders on 8 April 2017
Most points scored — 90 points
90 - 7 Old Elthamians at home to Exmouth on 25 March 2017
Most tries in a match — 15
90 - 7 Old Elthamians at home to Exmouth on 25 March 2017
Most conversions in a match — 11
Old Elthamians at home to Exmouth on 25 March 2017
Most penalties in a match — 5 (x6)
Exmouth at home to London Irish Wild Geese on 17 September 2016
Cinderford away to Worthing Raiders on 24 September 2016
Canterbury away to London Irish Wild Geese on 22 October 2016
Redingensians Rams away to Old Elthamians on 12 November 2016
Cinderford at home to Worthing Raiders on 14 January 2017
Bury St Edmunds away to Barnes on 11 March 2017
Most drop goals in a match — 1
N/A - multiple teams

Player
Most points in a match — 29
 Gary Kingdom for Taunton Titans at home to Exmouth on 10 September 2016
Most tries in a match — 5
 Dominic Lespierre for Old Elthamians at home to Barnstaple on 29 April 2017
Most conversions in a match — 9 (x2)
 Bertie Hopkin for Chinnor at home to Exmouth on 8 October 2016
 Tom White for Old Elthamians at home to Barnstaple on 29 April 2017
Most penalties in a match — 5 (x6)
 George Meadows for Exmouth at home to London Irish Wild Geese on 17 September 2016
 James Moffat for Cinderford away to Worthing Raiders on 24 September 2016
 Ollie Best for Canterbury away to London Irish Wild Geese on 22 October 2016
 Jacob Atkins for Redingensians Rams away to Old Elthamians on 12 November 2016
 James Moffat for Cinderford at home to Worthing Raiders on 14 January 2017
 Glyn Hughes for Bury St Edmunds away to Barnes on 11 March 2017
Most drop goals in a match — 1
N/A - multiple players

Attendances
Highest — 1,664
Bishop's Stortford at home to Barnes on 29 April 2017
Lowest — 45
Barnes at home to Worthing Raiders on 17 December 2016
Highest Average Attendance — 752
Redruth
Lowest Average Attendance — 151
Clifton

See also
 English rugby union system
 Rugby union in England

References

External links
 NCA Rugby

2016-17
2016–17 in English rugby union leagues